Shivaji Rao Gaikwad (born 12 December 1950), known professionally as Rajinikanth, is an Indian actor, producer and screenwriter who works mainly in Tamil cinema.   In a career spanning over five decades, he has done more than 160 films that includes films in Tamil, Hindi, Telugu, Kannada, Bengali, and Malayalam. He is widely regarded as one of the most successful and popular actors in the history of Indian cinema. Known for his uniquely styled lines and idiosyncrasies in films, he has a huge fan base across South India and has a cult following. The Government of India honoured him with Padma Bhushan in 2000, Padma Vibhushan in 2016, India's third and second highest civilian honours, and Dadasaheb Phalke Award in 2019 for his contributions to Indian cinema.  

Following his debut in K. Balachander's 1975 Tamil drama Apoorva Raagangal, Rajinikanth's acting career commenced with a brief phase of portraying antagonistic characters in Tamil films. His major positive role as a scorned lover in S. P. Muthuraman's Bhuvana Oru Kelvi Kuri (1977), 1978's Mullum Malarum and Aval Appadithan received him critical acclaim; the former earned him a Tamil Nadu State Film Award Special Prize for Best Actor. By the end of the decade, he had worked in all South Indian film industries and established a career in Tamil cinema. He then played dual roles in the action thriller Billa (1980), a remake of the Hindi film Don (1978). It was his biggest commercial success to that point, earned him stardom and gave him the action hero image. He starred in triple role in Moondru Mugam (1982), which earned him a special prize at the Tamil Nadu State Film Awards ceremony. The following year, he made his Bollywood debut with T. Rama Rao's top grossing Andhaa Kaanoon (1983). Nallavanukku Nallavan (1984) won him that year's Filmfare Award for Best Tamil Actor. In the latter half of the 1980s, he starred in several successful films in Tamil and Hindi, including Padikkadavan (1985), Mr. Bharath (1986), Bhagwaan Dada (1986), Velaikaran (1987), Dharmathin Thalaivan (1988) and Hum (1991). 

In 1991, Mani Ratnam's Tamil crime film Thalapathi, earned him major critical acclaim for his performance. He collaborated with Suresh Krissna for many films including Annaamalai (1992) and Baashha (1995); the latter was the biggest commercial success in his career yet as well as the highest grossing film in Tamil for many years.  His other success includes P. Vasu's Mannan (1992), Uzhaippali (1993) and K. S. Ravikumar's Muthu (1995) and Padayappa (1999); the latter which went on to become his and Tamil cinema's highest-grossing movie, exceeding Baashha.

After a few years of hiatus, he returned to acting with the comedy horror film Chandramukhi (2005); it went on to become again the highest-grossing Tamil film. His next, S. Shankar's Sivaji (2007) was the third Indian film to enter the 100 Crore Club. He played dual roles, as a scientist and an andro-humanoid robot, in the science fiction film Enthiran (2010) and its sequel 2.0 (2018), both being India's most expensive productions at the time of their release, and among the highest-grossing Indian films of all time.

He has won many awards, including a National Film Award, seven Tamil Nadu State Film Awards, a Nandi Award and a Filmfare Award. Rajinikanth was also named one of the most influential persons in South Asia by Asiaweek. He was also named by Forbes India as the most influential Indian of the year 2010.

Early life and background

Rajinikanth was born as Shivaji Rao Gaekwad on 12 December 1950 in a Marathi family in Bangalore, Mysore State (present day Karnataka). He was named after the Maratha Empire king Shivaji, and was brought up speaking Marathi at home and Kannada outside. His mother was a homemaker, and his father Ramoji Rao Gaekwad was a police constable. His ancestors hailed from Mavadi Kadepathar, Pune, Maharashtra. He is the youngest of four siblings in a family consisting of two elder brothers (Satyanarayana Rao and Nageshwara Rao) and a sister (Aswath Balubhai). After his father's retirement from work in 1956, the family moved to the suburb of Hanumantha Nagar in Bangalore and built a house there. He lost his mother at the age of nine.

Rajinikanth had his primary education at the Gavipuram Government Kannada Model Primary School in Bangalore. As a child, he was "studious and mischievous" with a great interest in cricket, football and basketball. During this time, his brother enrolled him at the Ramakrishna Math, a Hindu monastery set up by the Ramakrishna Mission. In the math, he was taught Vedas, tradition and history, which eventually instilled a sense of spirituality in him. In addition to spiritual lessons, he also began acting in plays at the math. His aspiration towards theatre grew at the math and was once given an opportunity to enact the role of Ekalavya's friend from the Hindu epic Mahabharata. His performance in the play received praise from the Kannada poet D. R. Bendre. After sixth grade, Rajinikanth was enrolled at the Acharya Pathasala Public School and studied there till completion of his pre-university course. During his schooling at the Acharya Pathasala, he spent a lot of time acting in plays.

Upon completion of his school education, Rajinikanth performed several jobs including that of a coolie, before getting a job in the Bangalore Transport Service as a bus conductor. He continued to take part in plays after the Kannada playwright Topi Muniappa offered him a chance to act in one of his mythological plays. He decided to take up an acting course in the newly formed Madras Film Institute after coming across an advertisement. Though his family was not fully supportive of his decision to join the institute, his friend and co-worker Raj Bahadur motivated him to join the institute and financially supported him during this phase. During his stay at the institute, he was noticed by the Tamil film director K. Balachander. Balachander provided Rajinikanth with his stage name to avoid confusion with fellow actor Sivaji Ganesan, having taken it from a character's name in his earlier film Major Chandrakanth. The director advised him to learn to speak Tamil, a recommendation that Rajinikanth quickly followed. Though he can read the language, he cannot write in it.

Acting career

1975–1977: Early career 

Rajinikanth began his film career with the Tamil film Apoorva Raagangal (1975), directed by K. Balachander. He was cast in a small role as the ex-husband of the female lead played by Srividya. The film explored relationships between people with wide age differences and was deemed controversial upon release. However, it received critical acclaim and won three National Film Awards including the Award for the Best Tamil Feature at the 23rd National Film Awards in 1976. A review from The Hindu noted that: "Newcomer Rajinikanth is dignified and impressive". His next release was Puttanna Kanagal's Kannada anthology film Katha Sangama (1976). Rajinikanth appeared in the last segment of the film; he played the role as a village ruffian who rapes a blind woman in the absence of her husband. Balachander cast him in a pivotal role in Anthuleni Katha (1976), the Telugu remake of his own Tamil film Aval Oru Thodar Kathai (1974). In Moondru Mudichuthe first Tamil film to feature him in a prominent rolehe played a character that "blithely row[s] away" when his friend drowns accidentally in the lake only to fulfill his desire to marry the former's girlfriend. His style of flipping the cigarette in the film made him popular among the audience. In his final release of the year, Baalu Jenu, he was cast as the main antagonist who troubles the female lead. He played similar roles in Balachander's Avargal (1977), and Bharathiraja's 16 Vayadhinile (1977). The same year, he made his first-ever appearance as a lead actor in the Telugu film Chilakamma Cheppindi (1977), which earned him his only nomination for the Filmfare Award for Best Actor – Telugu. S. P. Muthuraman experimented Rajinikanth in a positive role in Bhuvana Oru Kelvi Kuri (1977). The success of the film brought the duo together for 24 more films till the 1990s. Rajinikanth played supporting and "villainous" roles in most of the films released during the year. In Gaayathri he was cast as a pornographer who secretly films his relationship with his wife without her knowledge and in Galate Samsara he played the role of a married man who develops an affair with a cabaret dancer. He had 15 of his films released during the year.

1978–1989: Experimentation and breakthrough 
In 1978, Rajinikanth had 20 releases across Tamil, Telugu and Kannada. His first film of the year was P. Madhavan's Shankar Salim Simon, in which he was among the three leads. Following that, he co-starred alongside Vishnuvardhan in the Kannada film Kiladi Kittu. He played the second lead in Annadammula Savaal, which starred Krishna; Rajinikanth reprised his role from the Kannada original. He then played an important role in the supernatural thriller Aayiram Jenmangal. In Maathu Tappada Maga, he was the main antagonist. Bairavi, directed by M.Bhaskar, was the first Tamil film to cast Rajinikanth as a solo hero. It was for this film that he earned the sobriquet "Superstar". His next appearance Ilamai Oonjal Aadukirathu, a quadrangular love story written and directed by C. V. Sridhar, saw him play the role of a man who sacrifices his love for his friend, played by Kamal Haasan. The film's success prompted Sridhar to remake the film in Telugu, Vayasu Pilichindi, which retained the original cast of the Tamil film.

His next film, Vanakkatukuriya Kathaliye, had an introductory song to mark his entry, a trend that would soon catch on in with his later films. Mullum Malarum, released during the same period, received critical acclaim, and earned him his first Filmfare Award for Best Actor – Tamil nomination. The film marked the directional debut of Mahendran, with a screenplay adapted from a novel of the same name published in Kalki. It won the Filmfare Award for Best Tamil Film and a Special Prize (Best Actor) for Rajinikanth at the Tamil Nadu State Film Awards. Following this, he made a foray into Malayalam cinema with I. V. Sasi's fantasy film Allauddinum Albhutha Vilakkum, which was based on a story from the Arabian Nights. The same year, he acted in Dharma Yuddam, in which he played a mentally-ill person avenging the death of his parents. He then co-starred with N. T. Rama Rao in Tiger. Upon completion of Tiger, Rajinikanth had acted in 50 films over a period of four years, and in four languages. Some other popular films released during this period are the youthful entertainer Ninaithale Inikkum, the Tamil–Kannada bilingual Priya, the Telugu film Amma Evarikkaina Amma and the melodrama Aarilirunthu Arubathu Varai. Priya, based on a detective novel by Sujatha, had the distinction of being the first film of Rajinikanth to be shot mostly outside India, mainly in Southeast Asia. Aarilirunthu Arubathu Varai earned him his second nomination for the Filmfare Award for Best Actor – Tamil.

Raijinikanth, who credited Hindi film star Amitabh Bachchan as his inspiration, began playing Amitabh Bachchan's roles in Tamil remakes of his films. This began with Shankar Salim Simon (1978), a remake of Amar Akbar Anthony (1977), followed by Naan Vazhavaippen (1979), a remake of Majboor (1974). He was subsequently cast in a series of roles modelled after Amitabh Bachchan in Tamil remakes of his films. Rajinikanth starred in eleven Tamil remakes of Amitabh Bachchan films, as well as a Telugu remake of Amar Akbar Anthony, Ram Robert Rahim (1980), alongside Sridevi. The most successful of these were remakes of Salim–Javed films, such as Billa (1980), Thee (1981) and Mr. Bharath (1986).

During this phase of his career, Rajinikanth abruptly chose to quit acting, but was coaxed to return with the Tamil film Billa (1980), a remake of the Bollywood blockbuster Don (1978), written by Salim-Javed and starring Amitabh Bachchan. Billa had Rajinikanth playing dual roles and eventually became his first ever commercial success. His pairing with Sridevi continued in Johnny, where he was once again cast in a double role, earned him his third nomination for the Filmfare Award for Best Actor – Tamil. He also starred in Murattu Kaalai which was a commercial success. The success of Billa was a turning point in Rajinikanth's career, disproving detractors that claimed Rajnikanth was "finished" and which saw him accepted as a full-fledged hero. The success of Billa established Rajinikanth as the top star of Tamil cinema, overtaking Kamal Haasan.

In 1981, he appeared in Garjanai which was shot simultaneously in Kannada and Malayalam, making it his last film in those two languages to date. In K. Balachander's first home production, Netrikan, he played dual roles as a womanising father and a responsible son. His first full-length comedy was Thillu Mullu, directed by K. Balachander. He agreed to it solely due to the strong suggestion by his mentor that he should do non-commercial roles, to break the stereotyped action-hero mould by which he was getting famous at the time. Thillu Mullu earned him his fourth nomination for the Filmfare Award for Best Actor – Tamil. 1981 also saw the release of Thee, a remake of the 1975 Bollywood blockbuster Deewaar, also originally written by Salim-Javed and starring Amitabh Bachchan; in Thee, Rajinikanth reprised the role of Bachchan in the original. In 1982, he starred in Pokkiri Raja, Moondru Mugam, Thanikattu Raja, Puthukavithai and Enkeyo Ketta Kural. Moondru Mugam which starred Rajinikanth playing three different roles for the first time, earned him his fifth nomination for the Filmfare Award for Best Actor – Tamil.

By 1983, he was a popular actor across South Indian cinema, including Telugu and Kannada films. In 1983, he starred in his first Bollywood film, Andha Kanoon, alongside Amitabh Bachchan and Hema Malini. The film went on to become one of the highest-grossing films of that time. His 1984 film Naan Mahaan Alla, was directed by Muturaman and produced by K. Balachander. He acted in his first cameo role in the film Anbulla Rajinikanth. He played a triple role in John Jani Janardhan. His performance in Nallavanuku Nallavan earned him his first and only Filmfare Award for Best Actor – Tamil. In his 100th film Sri Raghavendra (1985), he played the Hindu saint Raghavendra Swami. His greatest success in Hindi films was his 101st film Bewafai. Released in 1985 with Rajesh Khanna as the lead hero and Rajinikanth as villain, it became a success and grossed  at the box office that year.

In the second half of the 1980s, Rajinikanth acted in commercially successful films such as Naan Sigappu Manithan (1985), Padikkathavan (1985), Mr. Bharath (1986), Velaikaran (1987), Guru Sishyan (1988) and Dharmathin Thalaivan (1988), with Velaikaran earning him his seventh nomination for the Filmfare Award for Best Actor – Tamil. In 1988, he made his only American film appearance in Bloodstone, directed by Dwight Little, in which he played an English-speaking Indian taxi driver. Rajinikanth finished the decade with films including Rajadhi Raja, Siva, Raja Chinna Roja and Mappillai while also starring in a few Bollywood productions. Raja Chinna Roja was the first Indian film to feature live action and animation.

1990–2001: Commercial stardom 

By the 1990s, Rajinikanth established himself as a commercial entertainer. Almost all the films released during this period were highly successful at the box office.

He began the decade with a blockbuster in Panakkaran (1990), which was a remake of Amitabh Bachchan's 1981 film Laawaris. The film earned him his eighth nomination for the Filmfare Award for Best Actor – Tamil. His next two Tamil films, the fantasy comedy Athisaya Piravi, (a remake of Chiranjeevi's 1988 film Yamudiki Mogudu) which also released in 1990 and the family drama Dharmadorai (1991), did above-average business at the box office. His stint with Bollywood continued since the past decade as he went on to star in more Hindi films. Hum released in 1991 saw him doing the second main lead with Amitabh Bachchan became an inspiration for Baashha. In 1991, he worked with Mani Ratnam in Thalapathi, which was heavily inspired by the Mahabharata. in which he co-starred with actor Mammooty; the film dealt with the friendship between two unknown characters based on Karna and Duryodhana, respectively, and was set in a more contemporary milieu and was both critically acclaimed and successful upon release. He received his ninth nomination for the Filmfare Award for Best Actor – Tamil for the film. He went on to appear in remakes of films from other languages, mostly from Hindi and Telugu. Annamalai, which released in 1992, was yet another friendship-centric film and was loosely based on the 1987 Bollywood film Khudgarz. The film was the first to have a Super Star Title Graphic Card. He received his tenth nomination for the Filmfare Award for Best Actor – Tamil for the film. Mannan, directed by P. Vasu, a remake of Kannada actor Rajkumar's 1986 blockbuster Anuraga Aralithu, also was released in 1992 and became a box office success. Rajinikanth wrote his first screenplay for the film Valli (1993), in which he also made a special appearance. He also starred in the film Yajaman, in which he played the role of Vaanavaraayan, a village chieftain. His romantic-comedy Veera (1994) was controversial for its climax but went on to become one of the highest-grossing films in 1994. That year, he earned his eleventh nomination for the Filmfare Award for Best Actor – Tamil for the action-drama Uzhaippali.

He joined hands with Suresh Krishna for Baashha (1995), which emerged as an industry record, and is routinely touted by fans and critics alike as a major-hit, as the film elevated him from being just another very popular actor to nearly demigod status among the masses. He made a cameo in Peddarayudu for his friend Mohan Babu and also helped him in obtaining the remake rights. The same year, he acted in yet another gangster film, Aatank Hi Aatank with Aamir Khan which was also his last Hindi film in a major role till date. His film Muthu, a remake of Mohanlal's blockbuster Malayalam film Thenmavin Kombathu, was another commercial success, directed by K. S. Ravikumar and produced by K. Balachander, and became the first Tamil film to be dubbed into Japanese, as Mutu: Odoru Maharaja. The film grossed a record US$1.6 million in Japan in 1998 and was responsible for creating a large Japanese fan-base for the actor. Muthus success in Japan led American news magazine Newsweek to comment in a 1999 article that Rajinikanth had "supplanted Leonardo DiCaprio as Japan's trendiest heartthrob". During a visit to Japan in 2006, Indian Prime Minister Manmohan Singh acknowledged the success of Muthu in the country during a speech, justifying the positive relationship between the two nations. He received his twelfth and thirteenth nominations for the Filmfare Award for Best Actor – Tamil for his performances in Baashha and Mushu.

He also entered Bengali cinema through Bhagya Debata, which was released at the end of 1995. 1997's Arunachalam, another commercial success, earned him his fourteenth nomination for the Filmfare Award for Best Actor – Tamil. Rajinikanth released his last film of the millennium with Padayappa (1999), which went on to become a blockbuster success, and earned him his fifteenth nomination for the Filmfare Award for Best Actor – Tamil. It starred Ramya Krishnan and Soundarya, the former critically acclaimed for her performance. It was also the last prominent role for veteran Tamil actor Sivaji Ganesan.

2002–2010: Struggles, resurgence and acclaim 
After a brief pause, Rajinikanth starred in Baba in 2002, for which he had also written the screenplay. Released with much fanfare and hype at the time, the film featured a story revolving around the reforming of a gangster, later revealed to be the reincarnation of the Hindu saint Mahavatar Babaji, and fights against political corruption. It fell short of market expectations and the high bids reportedly translated to heavy losses for the distributors. Rajinikanth himself repaid the losses incurred by the distributors. The film was received with comments such as "the bloom was off the rose" and that "the gold does not glitter any more". Pattali Makkal Katchi (PMK) leader S. Ramadoss condemned him for smoking and posing with beedis in the film. He was criticised for spoiling the Tamil youth by glorifying smoking and drinking. PMK volunteers attacked the theatres which screened the film and usurped film rolls and burned them.

Two years later, Rajinikanth signed up for P. Vasu's Chandramukhi (2005), a remake of the Malayalam film Manichitrathazhu. Upon release the film was highly successful at the box office, and in 2007 it set the record of being the longest running Tamil film. Chandramukhi was also dubbed in Turkish and in German as Der Geisterjäger and released in the respective nations. Following Chandramukhis release, it was reported that AVM Productions was set to produce a film directed by Shankar starring Rajinikanth – the largest collaboration yet for a Tamil film. The film was titled Sivaji and was released in the summer of 2007, following two years of filming and production. It became the first Tamil film to be charted as one of the "top-ten best films" of the United Kingdom and South Africa box offices upon release. He received his sixteenth nomination for the Filmfare Award for Best Actor – Tamil for his performance in the film. During the production of Sivaji, Soundarya Rajinikanth announced her intention of producing a computer-generated imagery film starring an animated version of her father titled Sultan: The Warrior. The film was set for release in 2008, however, it entered development hell, and its development status would become unknown over the next few years.

He worked with P. Vasu again for Kuselan, a remake of the Malayalam film Kadha Parayumbol, which was made simultaneously in Telugu as Kathanayakudu, in which Rajinikanth played an extended cameo role as himself, a film star in the Indian cinema, and as a best friend to the film's protagonist. According to Rajinikanth, the film somewhat narrated his early life. The film, however, performed poorly at box offices and led to many distributors incurring major losses. Rajinikanth also stated that he would work with Pyramid Saimira again to compensate for Kuselan."Is there anything left to be said about a man who, at 61, still manages to star in one of the most successful films of the year, not just in the south, but across India? Superstar Rajni once again proved that he is the actor with the Midas touch with the sci-fi flick Enthiran, where he played an ambitious scientist, a naive robot and an evil android bent on destroying the world [...] He did it with such aplomb that he's been the talk of the town for months. He might do one film in two years, but when he does, he pulls out all the stops."

Rajinikanth worked again with Shankar for the science fiction film Enthiran. The film was released worldwide in 2010 as the most expensive Indian film ever made, ultimately becoming the second highest-grossing film in India of its time. He received his seventeenth nomination for the Filmfare Award for Best Actor – Tamil for his performance in the film. The film's success lead to the Indian Institute of Management Ahmedabad to use the film as a case study to analyse the business of cinema and its success story in a post-graduate elective management course called Contemporary Film Industry: A Business Perspective. The course would also study Muthu.

2011–2014: Hospitalisation and return 
In January 2011, Rajinikanth was slated to appear in Rana, a period film to be produced by Soundarya Rajinikanth and directed by K. S. Ravikumar, who would work with the actor for a third time. During the principal photography of the film on 29 April 2011, he suffered a mild foodborne illness on the sets, which led to vomiting, dehydration, and exhaustion. He was treated at St. Isabel's Hospital for a day before being discharged. Five days later, he was rushed to the same hospital again after suffering from breathlessness and fever. He was diagnosed with bronchitis and was kept at the hospital for a week, while also spending a few days in an intensive care unit. Several conflicting reports of discharge dates arose, as well as claims of Rajinikanth's health deteriorating. Two days after his last discharge, Rajinikanth was admitted to the Sri Ramachandra Medical College and Research Institute on 16 May 2011 for recurring respiratory and gastrointestinal problems. The hospital maintained that Rajinikanth was in stable condition and showed positive response to treatment. It was widely reported that he required a kidney transplantation, which was later denied by Dhanush.

On 21 May 2011, Aishwarya Rajinikanth released a photo of her and Rajinikanth in his hospital ward, both posing with a thumbs signal, responding to fans' negative reaction to news reports. The hospital restricted unauthorised visitors. Rajinikanth's brother, Sathyanarayana Rao Gaekwad, reported that the cause of the sudden illness was due to stress from rapid weight-loss and changes in diet, as well as withdrawal of alcohol consumption and smoking cessation. After addressing fans in a 4-minute digitally recorded voice message to the media, Rajinikanth, under the advice of Amitabh Bachchan, travelled from Chennai to Singapore with his family on 21 May 2011, where he was to undergo further treatment for nephropathy at Mount Elizabeth Hospital. After spending over two weeks at the hospital, he was finally discharged on 15 June 2011 and continued to recuperate in Singapore, before returning to Chennai on 13 July 2011.

Despite several failed attempts to restart Rana upon his return, Rajinikanth reprised his Enthiran character, Chitti, in the Bollywood science-fiction film Ra.One (2011) in a guest appearance alongside Shah Rukh Khan and Kareena Kapoor. In November 2011, it was decided that Rana would be shelved in favour of a new project, titled Kochadaiiyaan. Unfortunately the film became a huge disaster at the box office. The motion capture film, which is the first of its kind in India, was released in 2014 to positive reviews. Kochadaiiyaan, and the 3D release of Sivaji in 2012, made Rajinikanth the first Indian actor to have appeared in four different forms of world cinema: black-and-white, colour, 3D and motion capture. Following the completion of Kochadaiiyaan, Rajinikanth began work in Ravikumar's next directorial venture, titled Lingaa alongside Anushka Shetty and Sonakshi Sinha. The film was released on 12 December 2014, coinciding with his birthday, and received mixed reviews from critics.

2016–present: Matured roles 
Rajinikanth's next film was director Pa. Ranjith's crime drama Kabali, produced by S. Thanu. The film was released in July 2016. Also, at the Ananda Vikatan Cinema Awards, the film was nominated at five categories winning all of them, and also won five awards, at the Edison Awards, and two nominations at the 6th South Indian International Movie Awards. He also received his eighteenth nomination for the Filmfare Award for Best Actor – Tamil for his performance in the film.

In August 2016, it was announced that Rajinikanth and director Ranjith would work together again for a film with Dhanush as producer, titled Kaala, in which Rajinikanth plays a Dharavi-dwelling gangster who fights against corporate takeover of the slum. The film was officially released on 7 June 2018 and received positive reviews from critics. In 2018 he also appeared in S. Shankar's 2.0 reprising the roles of Dr. Vaseegaran and Chitti, alongside Akshay Kumar and Amy Jackson. The film was released on 29 November 2018 and was commercially successful at the box office. The film earned over  worldwide on its first day, which was the second-highest ever for an Indian film. The film crossed  in its opening weekend to be the highest-grossing film worldwide for that week. The combined gross earnings of Kaala, 2.0 and Petta by the end of January 2019 was determined to be over  1000 crore according to trade analysts. Rajinikanth worked with AR Murugadoss in the film Darbar, which released in 2020. He played the role of a police officer after 27 years since his last film as a police officer was the Tamil film Pandian. Despite the film receiving mixed reviews, the film grossed  crore at the box office, making it one of Rajinikanth's highest-grossing films and the highest-grossing Tamil films of 2020. The next project of Rajinikanth was with director Siva, the film titled Annaatthe where he played role of a protective brother. The film was released on 4 November 2021. The film became a commercial success at the box office by grossing around  beating the collections made by other Tamil films like Master and Maanaadu. His next 169th film is with director Nelson which was tentatively titled Thalaivar 169. On 17 June 2022, the titled was announced to be Jailer and Rajinikanth will be playing an experienced jailer in the film. The film will be released theatrically on 14 April 2023.

Political career

Rajinikanth said: "Even God cannot save Tamil Nadu if AIADMK returns to power." Rajinikanth wholeheartedly supported the DMK and Tamil Mannila Congress alliance and asked the people of Tamil Nadu and his fans to vote for that alliance. This alliance had a complete victory in 1996. Rajinikanth also supported the DMK-Tamil Mannila Congress alliance in the 1996 Indian general election and 1998 Indian general election.

Later in 2004, Rajinikanth said he would personally vote for the Bharatiya Janata Party (BJP) but would not extend his support to any front during the upcoming Indian general election. The party, however, failed to win any seats in Tamil Nadu in the Lok Sabha.

Rajinikanth canceled his visit to Sri Lanka on March 2017 at the urging of Tamil Nadu politicians. Leaders of the BJP criticized this choice. In June 2017, BJP leader Subramanian Swamy alleged that Rajinikanth was illiterate and unfit for politics. He also accused Rajinikanth of financial fraud, claiming that he has strong proof of financial irregularities by Rajinikanth that will bring down Rajinikanth's political aspirations.

However several political analysts state Rajinikanth has missed his chance and unlike 1996 when he was at his peak it will be very difficult for him to make a significant impact in 2019.

Rajinikanth announced entry into politics on 31 December 2017 and confirmed his intention to contest in the 2021 Tamil Nadu Legislative Assembly elections in all 234 constituencies. He stated that his party would resign if it was unable to fulfill its electoral promises within three years of coming into power. Rajinikant dissolved his party Rajini Makkal Mandram (RMM) on 12 July 2021 and also said that he has no plans to enter politics in the future.

Acclaim and criticism

Acting style
Rajinikanth is widely regarded as one of the most popular actors in the history of Indian cinema. His popularity has been attributed to "his uniquely styled  and idiosyncrasies in films, as well as his political statements and philanthropy". Many also cite reasons for Rajinikanth's popularity as coming from his larger-than-life super-hero appearance in many films, supported by gravity-defying stunts and charismatic expressions, all while attempting to maintain modesty in real-life. Almost every film of Rajinikanth has punchlines delivered by him in an inimitable style, and these punchlines often have a message or even warn the film's antagonists. These lines are usually fabricated to create new ones or even be taken in a comical way, but do not fail to create a sense of entertainment among viewers.

Rajinikanth is one of the highest-grossing actors in Tamil cinema history. After opening his first official Twitter account in 2014, Rajinikanth received over 210,000 followers within 24 hours, which according to The Economic Times was deemed by social media research firms as the fastest rate of followers for any Indian celebrity, as well as among the top-10 in the world. In 2015, a film about his fandom, For the Love of a Man, premiered at the 71st Venice International Film Festival.

Comments on social issues

In 2002, Rajinikanth undertook a day-long fast to protest the Government of Karnataka's decision to not release Kaveri River water into Tamil Nadu, and announced that he would contribute  toward a plan to interlink Indian rivers. He met with Indian Prime Minister Atal Bihari Vajpayee and many experts to canvass support for the project. His hunger strike was independent of the Nadigar Sangam, who organised their own solidarity protest for the same cause. Film director Bharathi Raja lashed out against Rajinikanth, alleging that he is dividing the film industry and saying that he was a "traitor who had a tacit understanding with the Karnataka government".

In 2008, Rajinikanth took part in a hunger strike organised by the Nadigar Sangam against Karnataka's stance on the Hogenakkal Falls water dispute, during which he gave a speech against politicians in Karnataka. It led to the state announcing a ban on him and his film Kuselan (2008). The ban was lifted after Rajinikanth appeared on TV9 Kannada and issued an apology for his speech. He later thanked the Government of Karnataka for lifting the ban and allowing the film's release in the state. The apology and subsequent gratitude towards Karnataka led to strong reactions from Nadigar Sangam members R. Sarathkumar, Sathyaraj and Radha Ravi, who called the apology a disgrace to Tamils and opined that his speech never provoked the sentiments of the Kannada people. Rajinikanth's support toward fellow actor Ajith Kumar, who in 2010 condemned the forceful inclusion of Tamil cinema personae in political affairs, broke into a controversy.
In May 2018, Rajinikanth received negative criticism and reactions after justifying police action during the Thoothukudi massacre.

In 2020, Rajinikanth quoted a 2017 article from Outlook, which reported that Dravidar Kazhagam founder Periyar E. V. Ramasamy garlanded the idols of Hindu deities Rama and Sita with footwear at an atheist rally in 1971. His remarks were criticized by supporters of Periyar. In response to the backlash, Rajinikanth stated, "I did not speak on something that didn't happen. I've only spoken on what was reported. It was reported in Outlook also. Sorry, I will not apologise".

Personal life

Relationships
While he was working as a bus conductor in Bangalore, Rajinikanth met a medical student named Nirmala and started a relationship. After seeing him perform in a stage play, she encouraged him to pursue an acting career and sent an application to the Adyar Film Institute on his behalf and unbeknownst to him. Although he took up the offer and proceeded with his acting career, Rajinikanth has since lost contact with her.

Family
Rajinikanth married Latha Rangachari, a student of Ethiraj College for Women who interviewed him for her college magazine. The marriage took place on 26 February 1981, in Tirupati, Andhra Pradesh. The couple has two daughters named Aishwarya Rajinikanth and Soundarya Rajinikanth. Latha runs a school named "The Ashram".

Aishwarya married actor Dhanush on 18 November 2004 and they have two sons, Yathra and Linga. His younger daughter, Soundarya, works in the Tamil film industry as a director, producer and graphic designer. She married industrialist Ashwin Ramkumar on 3 September 2010 and have a son Ved Krishna. In September 2016, Soundarya revealed that she and her husband had filed for divorce by mutual consent due to irreconcilable differences. In July 2017, the couple officially divorced. She has married Vishagan Vanangamudi, an actor and businessman, on 11 February 2019 at Leela Palace in Chennai.

Views
Rajinikanth is a Hindu, who practices spiritualism and is a strong believer of spirituality. He is also a practitioner of yoga and meditation. Rajinikanth has religiously visited major Hindu temples prior to the release of each of his films; for instance he visited the Tirumala Venkateswara Temple before the release of Sivaji in 2007 and visited Sathya Sai Baba at Prasanthi Nilayam in Andhra Pradesh before the release of Kuselan the following year. He also occasionally leaves for pilgrimage to the Himalayas.

He has often referred to Ramakrishna Paramahamsa, Swami Satchidananda, Ragavendra Swami, Mahavatar Babaji, and Ramana Maharishi as his favourite spiritual leaders.

Philanthropy
According to Naman Ramachandran, the author of Rajinikanth: The Definitive Biography, most of Rajinikanth's philanthropic activities went unpublicised because he chose to keep them undisclosed. In the 1980s, when superstitious beliefs in Tamil Nadu created a stigma towards eye donation, Rajinikanth took the case of campaigning in support of corneal transplantation via television and public speeches. In 2011, Rajinikanth announced his support for the anti-corruption movement led by Anna Hazare and offered his commercial wedding venue, the Raghavendra Kalyana Mandapam, in Chennai free of cost for the India Against Corruption members to hold their fast. He also provided lodging in the venue for sanitary workers hired to clean up after the 2015 South India floods. Rajinikanth's fan associations regularly organise blood donation and eye donation camps and distribute food during his birthday.

Money lending allegation 
However, the Income Tax Department observed that he had claimed a considerable sum of professional expenses and thus carried out a survey in 2005 at his residence at Poes Garden. During the survey, the IT-Department found out that he had accounted for a lost of costs as his professional costs and it was also discovered that not even one-tenth of the residential property was allocated to professional purposes. Moreover, when Rajinikanth was questioned by the I-T department if he's in the money lending business, he initially denied it. Later, though, he admitted to the IT-Department that he was indeed a money lender, and that he had loaned money as a source of profit at an interest rate of 18 percent. Later, for all three years in dispute, Rajinikanth was forced to submit revised reports, confessing he had earned more than what was reported in the initial report on 14 February 2005. But the I-T department penalized him , since he filed revised returns only after they surveyed him.

This was challenged by Rajinikanth and his lawyers, and in January 2020 the I-T department wrote off the fine, due to its recent decision to withdraw from appeals in cases below . The news that Rajinikanth told the Income Tax department that he was lending money at an 18 per cent interest rate has earned outrage and criticism for his high interest rate loans, which is a big problem in Tamil Nadu.

Filmography

Awards, honours and recognition 

Rajinikanth has received numerous awards for many of his films, mostly in Tamil. He received his first and only Filmfare Award for Best Tamil Actor in 1984 for Nallavanuku Nallavan. Later he received Filmfare Award nominations for his performances in Sivaji (2007) and Enthiran (2010). As of 2014, Rajinikanth has received six Tamil Nadu State Film Awards for his performances in various films. He also received numerous awards from Cinema Express and Filmfans' Association for his on-screen performances and off-screen contributions in writing and producing. 

Rajinikanth received the Kalaimamani award in 1984 and the M. G. R. Award in 1989, both from the Government of Tamil Nadu. In 1995, the South Indian Film Artistes' Association presented him with the Kalaichelvam Award. He was honoured with the Padma Bhushan (2000) and the Padma Vibhushan (2016) by the Government of India. He was selected as the Indian Entertainer of the Year for 2007 by NDTV, competing against the likes of Shahrukh Khan. The Government of Maharashtra honoured him with the Raj Kapoor Award the same year. He received the Chevalier Sivaji Ganesan Award for Excellence in Indian Cinema at the 4th Vijay Awards. Rajinikanth was also named one of the most influential persons in South Asia by Asiaweek. 

He was named by Forbes India as the most influential Indian of the year 2010. In 2011, he was awarded the Entertainer of the Decade Award by NDTV for the year 2010 by the then Indian Minister for Home Affairs P. Chidambaram. In December 2013, he was honoured by NDTV as one among the "25 Greatest Global Living Legends". In 2014, he was presented with the Indian Film Personality of the Year Award at the 45th IFFI. Rajinikanth received Dadasaheb Phalke Award at the 67th National Film Awards presentation ceremony, at Vigyan Bhawan in New Delhi, Monday, 25 October 2021.

Notes

References

Bibliography

Further reading

External links

 
 
 

 
1950 births
Indian male film actors
Living people
Male actors from Bangalore
Recipients of the Padma Bhushan in arts
Recipients of the Padma Vibhushan in arts
Male actors in Tamil cinema
Male actors in Hindi cinema
Male actors in Kannada cinema
Tamil screenwriters
Male actors in Malayalam cinema
Film producers from Bangalore
Tamil Nadu State Film Awards winners
Filmfare Awards South winners
M.G.R. Government Film and Television Training Institute alumni
Marathi people
20th-century Indian male actors
21st-century Indian male actors
Male actors in Telugu cinema
Screenwriters from Bangalore
Dadasaheb Phalke Award recipients